A virivore (sometimes referred to as virovore)  is an organism which obtains energy and nutrients from the consumption of viruses. Virivory is a well-described process in which organisms, primarily heterotrophic protists, but also some metazoans consume viruses as a source of nutrition.

Ecological implications
Viruses are the most abundant biological entities in aquatic ecosystems. For example, marine viruses have typical abundances of millions of particles per mL, with similar abundances in freshwater, and are particularly rich in phosphorus and nitrogen. It has been estimated based on in situ grazing rates, that when in the presence of natural abundances of bacteria and viruses, a protistan grazer could obtain up to 9% of the carbon, 14% of the nitrogen and 28% of the phosphorus that is supplied by bacteria. Moreover, the freshwater ciliate Halteria was able to increase in abundance when its only source of food was a large Chlorovirus that infects freshwater green algae in environments. Although viruses can be an important nutritional source for heterotrophic protists, in natural waters they are typically not in high enough concentrations to be a major source of viral removal; however, in benthic systems, metazoans may have a larger role in the removal of viruses.

References

Viruses
Microbiology
Ecology terminology